István Szebeny (22 November 1890 – 11 March 1953) was a Hungarian rower. He competed in the men's eight event at the 1912 Summer Olympics. Three elder brothers, Miklós, György and Antal, were also Olympic rowers.

References

1890 births
1953 deaths
Hungarian male rowers
Olympic rowers of Hungary
Rowers at the 1912 Summer Olympics
Rowers from Budapest